Badminton at the 1983 Southeast Asian Games was held at Singapore Badminton Hall, Singapore City, Singapore. Badminton events was held between 28 May to 6 June.

Medal winners
In the individual events, Indonesia captured 4 titles, while Singapore won a title in the men's singles event. Wong Shoon Keat made a history as the first ever Singaporean player to win a gold medal at the Games.

Semifinal results

Final results

Medal table

References

External links 
 https://eresources.nlb.gov.sg/newspapers/Digitised/Article/straitstimes19830530-1.2.106
 https://eresources.nlb.gov.sg/newspapers/Digitised/Article/straitstimes19830531-1.2.123

1983
Badminton tournaments in Singapore
1983 Southeast Asian Games events
1983 in badminton